Leon Damer (born 31 January 2000) is a German professional footballer who plays as a winger for Hallescher FC.

Career
Damer made his professional debut for TSV Havelse in the 3. Liga on 5 September 2021 against Borussia Dortmund II.

On 9 May 2022, Damer signed a two-year contract with Hallescher FC, joining the club from the 2022–23 season.

References

External links
 
 
 
 

2000 births
Living people
German footballers
Association football forwards
TSV Havelse players
Hallescher FC players
3. Liga players
Regionalliga players
Footballers from Hanover